Rajiv Gandhi Education City is a planned education city in Sonipat in the Indian state of Haryana. The city comes under the National Capital Region, Delhi and also under the Municipal Corporation and Urban Agglomeration of Sonipat City. It is planned to host at least 13 educational institutions including universities, medical colleges and engineering colleges. The park is planned to cover 2,026 acres and foundation stones were laid in June 2012.

Institutes

 granted deemed university status

Technopark
On 4 April 2018, the newly built Technopark costing INR175 crore was unveiled by the Chief Minister of Haryana at the Rajiv Gandhi Education City, Sonipat. It is aimed at boosting the technical skills, dissemination and expansion of technical skills in the state.

See also

 List of institutions of higher education in Haryana

References

Education in Haryana
Sonipat